Os triangulare may refer to:
Triquetral bone
A nearby accessory bone of the wrist